Megamelodes is a genus of mostly European planthoppers erected by W. J. Le Quesne in 1960.  Some authorities place this genus as incertae sedis within the Delphacidae, or it is included in the tribe Delphacini.

The species M. quadrimaculatus can be found locally in marshy areas across the southern part of England and Wales.

Species
BioLib includes:
 Megamelodes lequesnei Wagner, 1963
 Megamelodes quadrimaculatus (Signoret, 1865) (synonym M. fieberi (Scott, 1870))
 Megamelodes venosus (Germar, 1830)

References

External links 
 

Auchenorrhyncha genera
Hemiptera of Africa
Hemiptera of Europe
Delphacidae